Kevin Hulme is a footballer who played as a midfielder in the Football League for Bury, Chester City, Doncaster Rovers, Lincoln City, Halifax Town and York City.

References

1967 births
Living people
People from Farnworth
Association football midfielders
English footballers
Radcliffe F.C. players
Bury F.C. players
Chester City F.C. players
Doncaster Rovers F.C. players
Lincoln City F.C. players
Macclesfield Town F.C. players
Halifax Town A.F.C. players
York City F.C. players
Altrincham F.C. players
English Football League players